This is a list of United States ambassadors to Uzbekistan.

The United States recognized Uzbekistan on December 25, 1991, and established diplomatic relations on February 19, 1992.

The embassy was opened by interim ambassador Michael Mozur on March 16, 1992.

See also
Embassy of Uzbekistan, Washington, D.C.
United States – Uzbekistan relations
Foreign relations of Uzbekistan
Ambassadors of the United States

References

United States Department of State: Background notes on Uzbekistan

External links
 United States Department of State: Chiefs of Mission for Uzbekistan
 United States Department of State: Uzbekistan
 United States Embassy in Tashkent

Uzbekistan
United States